Epsilon Microscopii, Latinized from ε Microscopii, is a single, white-hued star in the southern constellationof  Microscopium. It is faintly visible to the naked eye with an apparent visual magnitude of 4.71. The annual parallax shift of the star is 19.7054 mas as measured from Earth, which yields a distance estimate of around 166 light years. It is moving further from the Sun with a radial velocity of +7 km/s.

This star has a stellar classification of A1 V, indicating it is an A-type main-sequence star that is generating energy through hydrogen fusion at its core. The stellar spectrum displays an overabundance of silicon in the star's atmosphere, but the abundance of iron is the same as in the Sun. The star has 2.2 times the mass of the Sun and 2.2 times the Sun's radius. It is around a half billion years old and is spinning rapidly with a projected rotational velocity of 127 km/s. Epsilon Microscopii is radiating about 36 times the Sun's luminosity from its photosphere at an effective temperature of 9,126 K.

Epsilon Microscopii was a latter designation of the star 4 Piscis Austrini. 

This star was the brightest star in the obsolete constellation Globus Aerostaticus.

References

A-type main-sequence stars
Microscopium
Microscopii, Epsilon
CD-32 16498
202627
105140
8135